Inna Tsyganok (Ukrainian Інна Циганок (patronymic: Олегівна) and Russian Инна Цыганок; born 24 January 1986 in Zhovti Vody,) is a professional Ukrainian Russian triathlete, member of the Ukrainian National Team and National Champion of the year 2009.
In 2011, Tsyganok took part in ITU competitions "representing ITU", i.e. without a citizenship, which seems to be a violation of the ITU regulations. Since August 2011 she is officially "representing Russia".

French Club Championship Series 
Taking part at the prestigious French Club Championship Series Lyonnaise des Eaux Tsyganok proved to be the main stay of the club Stade Poitevin Triathlon.

In 2009, at Dunkirk, the first triathlon of the Lyonnaise des Eaux circuit, Tsyganok placed 17th (6th in the U23 category) and could push Stade Poitevin to the 9th position in the team ranking. The second international guest star, Felicity Sheedy Ryan, placed 22nd and the three French members of the team, Melissa Grignard, Charlotte Lancereau and Anne Claire Menant, placed 38th, 52nd, and 63rd respectively.

In 2010, Tsyganok took part in three of the five triathlons of the Club Championship: at Beauvais (13 June 2010) she placed 9th, at Tourangeaux (29 August 2010) 19th, and at the Grand Final in La Baule (Triathlon Audencia, 18 September 2010) 26th, thus she was always the best or second best of her club. At Dunkirk and at Paris, Stade Poitevin had to replace Tsyganok with Natalia Shliakhtenko.

In 2011, Tsyganok took part at the opening triathlon of the season in Nice (24 April 2011), placing 20th and turning out the best of the club's triathletes. At Dunkirk (22 May 2011), Tsyganok placed 16th and was the club's second best triathlete behind Sheedy Ryan.

ITU Competitions 
In the nine years from 2002 to 2010 Tsyganok took part in 43 ITU competitions and achieved 12 top ten positions.
In April 2011 Tsyganok opened her new season with another top ten position at the European Cup in Antalya.

In 2011, the ITU rankings do not state Tsyganok's nationality any more but give her country as «ITU». The Ukrainian Triathlon Federation still enumerates Tsyganok among the elite members of the National Team, but Tsyganok also took part at the Russian National Championships in Penza (27 May 2011) placing 3rd. Since 2011, the ITU lists Russia as her country.

The following list is based upon the official ITU rankings and the Athlete's Profile Page.

Unless indicated otherwise, the following events are triathlons (Olympic Distance) and refer to the Elite category.

BG = the sponsor British Gas · DNF = did not finish · DNS = did not start

External links 

 ITU Profile Page
 Ukrainian Triathlon Federation Федерация триатлона Украины in Ukrainian

Notes 

Ukrainian female triathletes
Russian female triathletes
1986 births
Living people
Sportspeople from Zhytomyr
People from Zhovti Vody
Sportspeople from Dnipropetrovsk Oblast